The Planters Mercantile, is located in Bluffton, South Carolina. It was built in 1890. Unlike most 19th century commercial buildings on Calhoun St., the Mercantile is built with two full stories; the ground floor store has very high ceilings, tall windows and entry doors. The store was a business which offered the area, according to their bill head: Clothing, Dry Goods, Boots, Shoes, Hats and Groceries, Furniture, Wagons, Buggies, and Harness, Sewing Machines, Trunks and Satchels, Cigars, Feed, Grits, Flour, Boat Supplies, Coffins and Fixture.
Abram suffered an early and possibly accidental death. In 1920 Moses sold the entire property to Julius Ulman and J. Weitz; then in 1930 Paul J. Viens bought it. It then passed back and forth between the Viens and Pinckneys, during which time a Mr. Goodman operated a store there. After his death, Morris Robinowich kept store there until 1972. Many individuals and groups have operated shops and stores therein.

References

Buildings and structures in Bluffton, South Carolina